Luther Noble Duncan (October 14, 1875 – July 26, 1947) was a 20th-century American educator and administrator.  He was a pioneer of 4-H youth development, a director of the Alabama Extension Service (now Alabama Cooperative Extension System) and president of the Alabama Polytechnic Institute (now Auburn University).

Early life

Duncan was born near Russellville in the northwest Alabama county of Franklin.  In 1896, he enrolled at Alabama Polytechnic Institute (API) in Auburn, Alabama, where he eventually emerged as a student leader.  To support his college career, he taught during the summer at a rural school near his home for $25 a month.

Following graduation, Duncan returned to his native northwest Alabama to teach for a short time in a rural county school before taking an instructor's job at an agricultural school in Wetumpka in east Alabama.  He held several other teaching jobs in various parts of Alabama before returning to Auburn to work as an instructor and research worker under the direction of famed agricultural scientist and researcher J.F. Duggar.

Exposure to Extension Work

Duncan's work with API took him to almost every county in Alabama.  His work with farmer institutes and similar types of efforts strengthened his knowledge of an informal type of educational outreach that eventually became known as Cooperative Extension work.  He was especially influenced by the work of Seaman A. Knapp, an early Extension educational pioneer.  During this early stage of his career, he also completed his master's degree at API in 1907.

Duncan eventually was appointed a professor of Extension in API's school of agriculture, jointly employed by API and by the U.S. Department of Agriculture and charged with serving as a "demonstration expert".  His work involved organizing demonstrations at schools and other agriculture-related venues to encourage youth and adults alike to adopt cutting-edge agricultural practices pioneered at API and other land-grant universities throughout the nation.

In this position, Duncan played an instrumental role organizing boys (or corn) clubs through the state — a movement that eventually would be combined with girls clubs to form what later became known as 4-H.  By 1909, the state had more than 2,000 corn club members.  By 1911, the number had grown to 10,000 members.

Duncan also played a major role in educational efforts aimed at diversifying Alabama agriculture, promoting hog and poultry production in addition to raising cotton, peanuts and tomatoes.

By 1915, following of the Smith-Lever Act, which formally established Cooperative Extension work in Alabama and the rest of the nation, Duncan was serving as superintendent of Junior and Home Economics Extension in cooperation with the U.S. Department of Agriculture. Meanwhile, Duggar, Duncan's mentor, assumed the directorship of the newly organized Alabama Extension Service.  The dual units persisted until Duncan assumed leadership of the Alabama Extension Service in 1920.

Alabama Extension Service Director

Along with Duggar's initial efforts, Duncan was instrumental in laying the groundwork for Cooperative Extension work in Alabama, ensuring the transition of the Extension mission from a primarily USDA-driven effort to one in which API, the state's first land-grant university, held primary responsibility.

Much of the Alabama Extension Service's initial efforts were focused on dealing with the bleak economic conditions associated with farming at the time.  Part of this involved developing a staff of specialists with statewide responsibilities and trained to provide agents in the field with up-to-date, research-based information from the land-grant university system.  Duncan also oversaw efforts to adopt new forms of technological delivery, including the purchase of a 1,000-watt radio station to broadcast educational information to the state's farm population.

Duncan is remembered as an Extension administrator who demanded near perfection from his employees.  He expected them not only to display a level of maturity "in order to secure and maintain the confidence and respect of farm people" but also to possess "unbounded energy, zeal, optimism, enthusiasm and persistency" — habits that should reflect "the very highest character".

"A man entering upon his duties of the day without a shave or with a dirty collar…will never get very far with what he represents", Duncan once said.

The Farm Bureau Controversy

Duncan was roundly criticized for his organization's close association with the Farm Bureau — an issue that would hound him throughout his API career.  From Extension's inception, agents worked with a wide array of agencies and other organizations associated with farming. But the relationship with the Farm Bureau, which was organized on the API campus at Duncan's behest in 1921, was unique.

From the beginning, Cooperative Extension work was widely considered a success in providing research-based information to the state's farmers.  But much of this progress was stymied by the lack of a cooperative farm marketing mechanism — the reason for the organization of a nationwide network of Farm Bureaus.

Critics maintained that Duncan favored the Farm Bureau over other farm organizations and even dictated Farm Bureau policy — a charge Duncan repeatedly denied.

In his defense, Duncan's actions reflected to a large degree those of the USDA, which had generally supported a close working relationship with Farm Bureau.  Nevertheless, Duncan drew harsh criticism from USDA for acquiescing to the publication of a circular that instructed Alabama Extension agents about how to recruit Farm Bureau members and to collect their dues.  The publication subsequently was withdrawn.

Throughout the controversy, Duncan stuck to his guns, stressing that one of the original charges of the Extension Service was to advise farm organizations.  He also contended that in supporting the Farm Bureau, he merely was assisting the farm organization with the best prospects for success.

Duncan conceded that relations between Extension and Farm Bureau had been too close at times, such as when Extension agents collected dues on behalf of the Farm Bureau.  But he stressed that these problems had been resolved.

A subsequent investigation of the issue by API's board of trustees revealed no wrongdoing.

President of Alabama Polytechnic Institute (later Auburn University)

Duncan, who had developed a strong reputation for managing a statewide organization on a lean budget, was heavily favored by the state's business and professional interests to succeed Bradford Knapp as president of API.   As far as many of them were concerned, this was precisely the kind of management style API needed in 1932, only three years after the onset of the Great Depression.

Nevertheless, Duncan's past association with the Farm Bureau continued to draw withering criticism from Victor Hanson, an API trustee and Birmingham News publisher.  Following a statewide newspaper campaign organized at Hanson's behest against Duncan, the API trustees, unable to reach agreement on Knapp's successor, appointed a three-man executive committee, which included Duncan, to manage the institute's affairs until final agreement could be reached on a permanent successor.

Duncan's financial acumen, demonstrated time and again during this especially cash-strapped period of API's history, eventually won over a majority of API trustees.  Duncan was installed as API president in 1935.

Duncan is perhaps best remembered as a dogged fighter for what he considered to be API's fair share of state funding.   While he remained a strong supporter of cooperation among Alabama's institutions of higher learning, he nonetheless stressed that this cooperation never should work to the detriment of API.

For example, Duncan maintained that the prevailing interpretation of the state's Teacher-Training Equalization Fund greatly favored the University of Alabama at API's expense, even consigning API to second-class status.

Working closely with Alabama Governor Bibb Graves, U.S. Senator John H. Bankhead and E.A. O'Neal, president of the American Farm Bureau, Duncan eventually secured passage of the Bankhead-Jones At, which increased funding for resident teaching, agricultural research and agricultural extension.

Duncan also was a strong supporter of the equalization principle that each Alabama student should receive the same level of state support regardless of the institution attended.  He also advocated a cooperative recruitment plan and the assignment of roles to Alabama and API so that would each could "render maximum service" in the areas it was best equipped to serve.

Unfortunately for Duncan, stiff opposition at the time prevented much of this vision from being realized in his lifetime.

Ironically, as he entered the twilight of his career, Duncan, however unwittingly, went to the mat once again over Extension's longstanding relationship with the Alabama Farm Bureau.  Incoming populist Gov. James "Big Jim" Folsom, along with API trustee and Folsom supporter Gould Beech, maintained that agriculture had suffered a relative decline — a problem, they claimed was due in large part to Alabama Extension — and that Extension was still engaged in improper political activity with the Farm Bureau.

Duncan, however, was unable to see this battle to the end, dying unexpectedly in the President's Mansion on July 26, 1947.

Legacy

Even today, Duncan remains a somewhat controversial figure in Alabama history.  He is best remembered for making the Alabama Extension Service and API driving forces on the Alabama political scene.  He also is viewed by many as a visionary and reformer — an early and vocal proponent of equitable funding for Alabama higher education, though one who never hesitated to secure what he considered to be API's fair share.

References

1875 births
1947 deaths
Agriculture educators
Presidents of Auburn University
Auburn University alumni
Alabama Cooperative Extension System
People from Auburn, Alabama
People from Franklin County, Alabama